A Wildlife Sanctuary is a protected area of importance for flora, fauna, or features of geological or other interest, which is reserved and managed for conservation and to provide opportunities for study or research. The Wild Life (Protection) Act, 1972 provides for the establishment of Protected Areas in India.

Wildlife sanctuaries of India, are classified as IUCN Category IV protected areas. As of 2017, 553 wildlife sanctuaries were established in India, covering . Among these, Project Tiger governs 51 tiger reserves, which are of special significance for the conservation of the Bengal tiger. The oldest bird sanctuary is Vedanthangal Bird Sanctuary near Chennai in Tamil Nadu state, and was established in 1796.
{
  "type": "ExternalData",
  "service": "geoshape",
  "properties": {
    "stroke": "#00ff00",
    "stroke-width": 2
  },
  "query": "\nSELECT ?id ?idLabel\n(concat('', ?idLabel, '') as ?title)\nWHERE\n{\n?id wdt:P814 wd:Q14545639. # is a district\n?id wdt:P17 wd:Q668. # in India\nSERVICE wikibase:label { bd:serviceParam wikibase:language 'en'}\n}"}

List of Wildlife Sanctuaries 
Wildlife Sanctuaries have been established in:

Andaman and Nicobar Islands

 Arial Island WLS
 Bamboo Island WLS
 Barren Island WLS
 Battimalv Island WLS
 Belle Island WLS
 Benett Island WLS 
 Bingham Island WLS
 Blister Island WLS
 Bluff Island WLS
 Bondoville Island WLS
 Brush Island WLS
 Buchanan Island  WLS
 Chanel Island WLS
 Cinque Islands WLS
 Clyde Island WLS
 Cone Island WLS
 Curlew (B.P.) Island WLS
 Curlew Island WLS
 Cuthbert Bay WLS
 Defence Island WLS
 Dot Island WLS
 Dottrell Island WLS
 Duncan Island WLS
 East Island WLS
 East of Inglis Island WLS
 Egg Island WLS
 Entrance Island WLS
 Flat Island Wildlife Sanctuary
 Gander Island WLS
 Girjan Island WLS
 Galathea Bay WLS
 Goose Island WLS
 Hump Island WLS
 Interview Island WLS
 James Island WLS
 Jungle Island WLS
 Kwangtung Island WLS
 Kyd Island WLS
 Landfall Island WLS
 Latouche Island WLS
 Lohabarrack (Saltwater Crocodile) WLS
 Mangrove Island WLS
 Mask Island WLS
 Mayo Island WLS
 Megapode Island WLS
 Montogemery Island WLS
 Narcondam Island WLS
 North Brother Island WLS
 North Island WLS
 North Reef Island WLS
 Oliver Island WLS
 Orchid Island WLS
 Ox Island WLS
 Oyster Island-I WLS
 Oyster Island-II WLS
 Paget Island WLS
 Parkinson Island WLS
 Passage Island WLS
 Patric Island WLS
 Peacock Island WLS
 Pitman Island WLS
 Point Island WLS
 Potanma Islands WLS
 Ranger Island WLS
 Reef Island WLS
 Roper Island WLS
 Ross Island WLS
 Rowe Island WLS
 Sandy Island WLS
 Sea Serpent Island WLS
 Shark Island WLS
 Shearme Island WLS
 Sir Hugh Rose Island WLS
 Sisters Island WLS
 Snake Island-I WLS
 Snake Island-II WLS
 South Brother Island WLS
 South Reef Island WLS
 South Sentinel Island WLS
 Spike Island-I WLS
 Spike Island-II WLS
 Stoat Island WLS
 Surat Island WLS
 Swamp Island WLS
 Table (Delgarno) Island WLS
 Table (Excelsior) Island WLS
 Talabaicha Island WLS
 Temple Island WLS
 Tillongchang Island WLS
 Tree Island WLS
 Trilby Island WLS
 Tuft Island WLS
 Turtle Islands WLS
 West Island WLS
 Wharf Island WLS
 White Cliff Island WLS

Andhra Pradesh

 Kolleru Bird Sanctuary, 1953
 Nelapattu Bird Sanctuary, 1976
 Pulicat Lake Bird Sanctuary, 1976
 Coringa Wildlife Sanctuary, 1978
 Nagarjunsagar-Srisailam Tiger Reserve, 1978
 Sri Venkateswara National Park, 1985
 Rollapadu Wildlife Sanctuary, 1988
 Sri Lankamalleswara Wildlife Sanctuary, 1988
 Krishna Wildlife Sanctuary, 1989
 Koundinya Wildlife Sanctuary, 1990
 Gundla Brahmeswaram Wildlife Sanctuary, 1990
 Sri Penusila Narasimha Wildlife Sanctuary, 1997
 Kambalakonda Wildlife Sanctuary, 2002

Arunachal Pradesh

 Pakke Tiger Reserve, 1977
 D'Ering Memorial Wildlife Sanctuary, 1978
 Itanagar Wildlife Sanctuary, 1978
 Mehao Wildlife Sanctuary, 1980
 Eaglenest Wildlife Sanctuary, 1989
 Sessa Orchid Sanctuary, 1989
 Kamlang Wildlife Sanctuary, 1989
 Dibang Wildlife Sanctuary, 1991
 Kane Wildlife Sanctuary, 1991
 Talley Valley Wildlife Sanctuary, 1995
 Yordi Rabe Supse Wildlife Sanctuary, 1996

Assam

 Garampani Wildlife Sanctuary, 1952
 Laokhowa Wildlife Sanctuary, 1972
 Bura Chapori Wildlife Sanctuary, 1974
 Bornadi Wildlife Sanctuary, 1980
 Pobitora Wildlife Sanctuary, 1987
 Chakrashila Wildlife Sanctuary, 1994
 Pani Dihing Wildlife Sanctuary, 1996
 Hoollongapar Gibbon Sanctuary, 1997
 Sonai Rupai Wildlife Sanctuary, 1998
 East Karbi-Anglong Wildlife Sanctuary, 2000
 Nambor Wildlife Sanctuary, 2000
 Nambor - Doigrung Wildlife Sanctuary, 2003
 Dehing Patkai Wildlife Sanctuary, 2004
 Amchang Wildlife Sanctuary, 2004
 Borail Wildlife Sanctuary
 Brainstorming Wildlife Sanctuary
 Deepor Beel Bird Sanctuary
 Marat Longri WLS

Bihar

 Bhimbandh Wildlife Sanctuary, 1976
 Gautam Budha Wildlife Sanctuary, 1976
 Pant Wildlife Sanctuary, 1978
 Udaypur Wildlife Sanctuary, 1978
 Kaimur Wildlife Sanctuary, 1982
 Nagi Dam Wildlife Sanctuary, 1987
 Nakti Dam Wildlife Sanctuary, 1987
 Kanwar Lake Bird Sanctuary, 1989
 Vikramshila Gangetic Dolphin Sanctuary, 1990
 Kusheshwar Asthan Bird Sanctuary, 1994
 Barela Jheel Salim Ali-Jubba sahni Bird Sanctuary, 1997
 Rajauli Wildlife Sanctuary

Chandigarh

 City Birds WLS
 Sukhna Lake WLS

Chhattisgarh

 Sitanadi Wildlife Sanctuary, 1974
 Achanakmar Wildlife Sanctuary, 1975
 Badalkhol Wildlife Sanctuary, 1975
 Barnawapara Wildlife Sanctuary, 1976
 Tamor Pingla Wildlife Sanctuary, 1978
 Semarsot Wildlife Sanctuary, 1978
 Bhairamgarh Wildlife Sanctuary, 1983
 Bhoramdev Wildlife Sanctuary, 2001
 Sarangarh-Gomardha WLS, 1975
 Pamed Wild Buffalo WLS, 1985
 Udanti Wild Buffalo WLS, 1985

Dadra Nagar Haveli and Daman and Diu

 Dadra and Nagar Haveli Wildlife Sanctuary
 Fudam Bird Sanctuary

Delhi

 Asola Bhatti Wildlife Sanctuary, 1992

Goa

 Bhagwan Mahavir Sanctuary, 1967
 Cotigao Wildlife Sanctuary, 1968
 Bondla Wildlife Sanctuary, 1969
 Salim Ali Bird Sanctuary, 1988
 Madei Wildlife Sanctuary, 1999
 Netravali Wildlife Sanctuary, 1999

Haryana

 Bhindawas Wildlife Sanctuary, 1986
 Chhilchhila Wildlife Sanctuary, 1986
 Abubshahar Wildlife Sanctuary, 1987
 Bir Shikargah Wildlife Sanctuary, 1987
 Nahar Wildlife Sanctuary, 1987
 Khaparwas Wildlife Sanctuary, 1991
 Khol Hi-Raitan Wildlife Sanctuary, 2004

Gujarat

 Nal Sarovar Bird Sanctuary, 1969
 Indian Wild Ass Sanctuary, 1973
 Jessore Sloth Bear Sanctuary, 1978
 Barda Wildlife Sanctuary, 1979
 Hingolgadh Nature Reserve, 1980
 Khijadiya Bird Sanctuary, 1981
 Ratanmahal Sloth Bear Sanctuary, 1982
 Shoolpaneshwar Wildlife Sanctuary, 1982
 Kutch Desert Wildlife Sanctuary, 1986
 Gaga Wildlife Sanctuary, 1988
 Thol Bird Sanctuary, 1988
 Rampara Vidi Wildlife Sanctuary, 1988
 Porbandar Bird Sanctuary, 1988
 Balaram Ambaji Wildlife Sanctuary, 1989
 Paniya Wildlife Sanctuary, 1989
 Purna Wildlife Sanctuary, 1990
 Jambughoda Wildlife Sanctuary, 1990
 Narayan Sarovar Sanctuary, 1995
 Kutch Bustard Sanctuary, 1995
 Mitiyala Wildlife Sanctuary, 2004
 Girnar Wildlife Sanctuary, 2008

Himachal Pradesh

 Bandli Wildlife Sanctuary
 Chail Wildlife Sanctuary
 Chandra Taal Wildlife Sanctuary
 Churdhar Sanctuary
 Daranghati Sanctuary
 Dhauladhar Wildlife Sanctuary
 Gamgul Siyabehi WLS
 Kais WLS
 Kalatop-Khajjiar WLS
 Kanawar WLS
 Khokhan WLS
 Kibber WLS
 Kugti WLS
 Lippa Asrang WLS
 Majathal WLS
 Manali WLS
 Nargu WLS
 Pong Dam Lake WLS
 Renuka WLS
 Rupi Bhaba WLS
 Sainj WLS
 Sangla Valley (Rakchham Chitkul) WLS
 Sech Tuan Nala WLS
 Shikari Devi WLS
 Shimla Water Catchment WLS
 Talra WLS
 Tirthan WLS
 Tundah WLS
 Rohila WLS

Jammu and Kashmir 

 Trikuta Wildlife Sanctuary, 1981
 Surinsar Mansar Wildlife Sanctuary, 1981
 Ramnagar Rakha WLS, 1981
 Nandni WLS, 1981
 Baltal-Thajwas WLS, 1987
 Gulmarg Wildlife Sanctuary, 1987
 Hirpora Wildlife Sanctuary, 1987
 Jasrota WLS, 1987
 Lachipora WLS, 1987
 Limber Wildlife Sanctuary, 1987
 Overa-Aru Wildlife Sanctuary, 1987
 Hokersar Wildlife Sanctuary, 1992
 Rajparian Wildlife Sanctuary, 2002
 Tral Wildlife Sanctuary, 2019

Jharkhand

 Dalma Wildlife Sanctuary, 1976
 Hazaribag Wildlife Sanctuary, 1976
 Gautam Budha Wildlife Sanctuary
 Koderma Wildlife Sanctuary, 1985
 Lawalong Wildlife sanctuary 
 Mahauadanr Wildlife Sanctuary
 Palamau Tiger Reserve
 Palkot Wildlife Sanctuary
 Parasnath Wildlife Sanctuary
 Topchanchi Wildlife Sanctuary
 Udhwa Lake Wildlife Sanctuary

Karnataka

 Adichunchanagiri Hills Wildlife Sanctuary
 Arabithittu Wildlife Sanctuary
 Attiveri Bird Sanctuary
 Bhadra Wildlife Sanctuary
 Bhimgad Wildlife Sanctuary
 Biligiriranga Hills
 Brahmagiri Wildlife Sanctuary
 Cauvery Wildlife Sanctuary
 Chincholi Wildlife Sanctuary
 Dandeli Wildlife Sanctuary
 Daroji Sloth Bear Sanctuary
 Ghataprabha
 Gudavi Bird Sanctuary
 Gudekote Wildlife Sanctuary
 Malai Mahadeshwara Wildlife Sanctuary
 Melkote Temple Wildlife Sanctuary
 Mookambika Wildlife Sanctuary
 Nugu WLS
 Pushpagiri Wildlife Sanctuary
 Ranibennur Blackbuck Sanctuary
 Ranganathittu Bird Sanctuary
 Ramadevarabetta Vulture Sanctuary
 Rangayyanadurga Four-horned antelope Wildlife Sanctuary
 Sharavati Valley Wildlife Sanctuary
 Shettihalli WLS
 Someshwara Wildlife Sanctuary
 Talakaveri Wildlife Sanctuary
 Jogimatti WLS
 Thimlapura WLS
 Yadahalli Chinkara Wildlife Sanctuary

Kerala

 Aralam Wildlife Sanctuary, 1984
 Chimmony Wildlife Sanctuary, 1984
 Chinnar Wildlife Sanctuary, 1984
 Choolannur Pea Fowl Sanctuary, 2007
 Idukki Wildlife Sanctuary, 1976
 Karimpuzha Wildlife Sanctuary, 2020
 Kottiyoor Wildlife Sanctuary, 2011
 Kurinjimala Sanctuary, 2006
 Malabar Wildlife Sanctuary, 2010
 Mangalavanam Bird Sanctuary
 Neyyar Wildlife Sanctuary, 1958
 Parambikulam Wildlife Sanctuary, 1973
 Peechi-Vazhani Wildlife Sanctuary, 1958
 Peppara Wildlife Sanctuary, 1983
 Periyar Wildlife Sanctuary, 1982
 Shendurney Wildlife Sanctuary, 1984
 Thattekad Bird Sanctuary, 1983
 Wayanad Wildlife Sanctuary, 1973

Ladakh

 Changtang Wildlife Sanctuary, 1987
 Karakoram Wildlife Sanctuary, 1987

Lakshadweep

 Pitti Bird Sanctuary, 1972
 Amini, India Wildlife Sanctuary

Madhya Pradesh

 Bori Wildlife Sanctuary, 1977
 Gandhi Sagar Sanctuary, 1974
 Nauradehi Wildlife Sanctuary, 1975
 National Chambal Sanctuary, 1979
 Ghatigaon Wildlife Sanctuary, 1981
 Karera Wildlife Sanctuary, 1981
 Ken Gharial Sanctuary, 1981
 Ralamandal Wildlife Sanctuary, 1989
 Kheoni Sanctuary
 Narsinghgarh Wildlife Sanctuary
 Bagdara Wildlife Sanctuary
 Orcha Wildlife Sanctuary
 Panpatha Wildlife Sanctuary
 Phen Wildlife Sanctuary
 Sailana Wildlife Sanctuary
 Sardarpur Wildlife Sanctuary
 Singhori Wildlife Sanctuary
 Son Gharial Sanctuary
 Veerangana Durgavati Wildlife Sanctuary, 1996
 Pachmarhi wildlife Sanctuary
 kuno wildlife sanctuary
 Ratapani Wildlife sanctuary
 snajay-dubri wildlife sanctuary
 Gangau wildlife saanctuary

Maharashtra

 Amba Barwa Wildlife Sanctuary, 1997
 Andhari Wildlife Sanctuary, 1986
 Aner Dam Wildlife Sanctuary
 Bhamragarh Wildlife Sanctuary, 1997
 Bhimashankar Wildlife Sanctuary, 1985
 Bor Wildlife Sanctuary, 1970
 Bordharan Wildlife Sanctuary
 Chaprala Wildlife Sanctuary 1986
 Deolgaon-Rehkuri WLS
 Dhyanganga WLS 1997
 Gangewadi New Great Indian Bustard Wildlife Sanctuary
 Gautala Autramghat Sanctuary, 1986
 Ghodazari Wildlife Sanctuary
 Great Indian Bustard Sanctuary, 1979
 Jayakwadi Bird Sanctuary, 1986
 Kalsubai Harishchandragad Wildlife Sanctuary
 Karanja Sohol Wildlife Sanctuary, 2000
 Karhandla Wildlife Sanctuary
 Karnala Bird Sanctuary, 1968
 Katepurna Wildlife Sanctuary, 1988
 Koka Wildlife Sanctuary, 2013
 Koyna Wildlife Sanctuary, 1985
 Lonar Wildlife Sanctuary, 2000
 Malvan Marine Wildlife Sanctuary
 Mansingdeo Wildlife Sanctuary2010
 Mayani Bird Sanctuary
 Mayureshwar Wildlife Sanctuary, 1997
 Melghat Wildlife Sanctuary, 1985
 Nagzira Wildlife Sanctuary 2012
 Naigaon Mayur Wildlife Sanctuary 1994
 Nandur Madhameshwar Wildlife Sanctuary 1986
 Narnala Wildlife Sanctuary, 1997
 Nawegaon Wildlife Sanctuary
 New Bor Wildlife Sanctuary
 New Nagzira Wildlife Sanctuary
 Painganga Wildlife Sanctuary, 1986
 Phansad Wildlife Sanctuary, 1986
 Radhanagari Wildlife Sanctuary, 1958
 Sagareshwar Wildlife Sanctuary
 Sudhagad Wildlife Sanctuary, 2013
 Tamhini Wildlife Sanctuary, 2013
 Tansa Wildlife Sanctuary, 1970
 Thane Creek Flamingo Wildlife Sanctuary 2015
 Thillari Wildlife Sanctuary
 Tipeshwar Wildlife Sanctuary
 Tungareshwar Wildlife Sanctuary, 2003
 Umred-Kharngla Wildlife Sanctuary
 Wan Wildlife Sanctuary
 Yawal Wildlife Sanctuary, 1969
 Yedsi Ramling Ghat Wildlife Sanctuary

Manipur

 Khongjaingamba Ching WLS, 2016
 Yangoupokpi-Lokchao WLS, 1989
 Kailam WLS
 Jiri-Makru WLS
 Bunning WLS
 Zeilad WLS
 Thinungei Bird Sanctuary

Meghalaya

 Baghmara Pitcher Plant Wildlife Sanctuary
 Nongkhyllem WLS
 Siju WLS
 Narpuh WLS

Mizoram

 Dampa Tiger Reserve
 Khawnglung WLS
 Lengteng Wildlife Sanctuary
 Ngengpui WLS
 Pualreng WLS
 Tawi WLS
 Thorangtlang WLS
 Tokalo WLS

Nagaland

 Fakim Wildlife Sanctuary 
 Khonoma Nature Conservation and Tragopan Sanctuary
 Pulie Badze Wildlife Sanctuary
 Rangapahar Wildlife Sanctuary
 Singphan Wildlife Sanctuary

Odisha

 Badrama Wildlife Sanctuary, 1962
 Bhitarkanika Wildlife Sanctuary, 1975
 Satkosia Gorge Wildlife Sanctuary, 1976
 Hadgarh Wildlife Sanctuary, 1978
 Nandankanan Wildlife Sanctuary, 1979
 Baisipalli Wildlife Sanctuary, 1981
 Kotgarh Wildlife Sanctuary, 1981
 Chandaka Elephant Sanctuary, 1982
 Khalasuni Wildlife Sanctuary, 1982
 Balukhand-Konark Wildlife Sanctuary, 1984
 Kuldiha Wildlife Sanctuary, 1984
 Debrigarh Wildlife Sanctuary, 1985
 Lakhari Valley Wildlife Sanctuary, 1985
 Nalbana Bird Sanctuary, 1987
 Sunabeda Tiger Reserve, 1988
 Gahirmatha Marine Sanctuary, 1997
 Karlapat Wildlife Sanctuary, 1992
 Kapilasa Wildlife Sanctuary, 2011
 Tikarpada Wildlife Sanctuary

Punjab

 Abohar Wildlife Sanctuary
 Bir Aishvan WLS
 Bir Bhadson WLS
 Bir Bunerheri WLS
 Bir Dosanjh WLS
 Bir Gurdialpura WLS
 Bir Mehaswala WLS
 Bir Motibagh WLS
 Harike Lake WLS
 Jhajjar Bacholi WLS
 Kathlaur Kushlian WLS
 Takhni-Rehampur WLS
 Nangal Wildlife Sanctuary

Pondicherry

 Oussudu Bird Sanctuary, 2008

Sikkim 

 Kyongnosla Alpine Sanctuary, 1977
 Fambong Lho Wildlife Sanctuary, 1984
 Shingba Rhododendron Sanctuary, 1984
 Maenam Wildlife Sanctuary, 1987
 Varsey Rhododendron Sanctuary, 1998
 Pangolakha Wildlife Sanctuary, 2002
 Kitam Bird Sanctuary, 2005

Rajasthan

Mount Abu Wildlife Sanctuary, 1960
Kumbhalgarh Wildlife Sanctuary, 1971
Tal Chhapar Sanctuary, 1971
National Chambal Sanctuary, 1979
Sita Mata Wildlife Sanctuary, 1979
Phulwari ki Nal Wildlife Sanctuary, 1983
Todgarh-Raoli Sanctuary, 1983
Sajjangarh Wildlife Sanctuary, 1987
Bassi Wildlife Sanctuary, 1988
 Bandh Baratha Wildlife Sanctuary, 1985
 Bhensrodgarh Wildlife Sanctuary, 1983
 Jaisamand Wildlife Sanctuary, 1955
 Jamwa Ramgarh Wildlife Sanctuary, 1982
 Jawahar Sagar Wildlife sanctuary, 1975
 Kailadevi Wildlife Sanctuary, 1983
 Kesarbagh Wildlife sanctuary, 1955
 Kumbhalgarh Wildlife Sanctuary, 1988
 Nahargarh Wildlife Sanctuary, 1980
 Ramgarh Vishdhari Wildlife Sanctuary, 1982
 Ramsagar Wildlife Sanctuary
 Sawaimadhopur Wildlife Sanctuary
 Sawai Man Singh Wildlife Sanctuary, 1984
 Shergarh Wildlife Sanctuary, 1983
 Van Vihar Wildlife Sanctuary, 1955

Tamil Nadu

 Vedanthangal Bird Sanctuary, 1936
 Mudumalai National Park and Wildlife Sanctuary, 1942
 Point Calimere Wildlife and Bird Sanctuary, 1967
 Indira Gandhi Wildlife Sanctuary, 1976
 Kalakkad Mundanthurai Tiger Reserve, 1976
 Vettangudi Bird Sanctuary, 1977
 Pulicat Lake Bird Sanctuary, 1980
 Vallanadu Wildlife Sanctuary, 1987
 Grizzled Squirrel Wildlife Sanctuary, 1988
 Karikili Bird Sanctuary, 1989
 Chitrangudi Bird Sanctuary, 1989
 Kanjirankulam Bird Sanctuary, 1989
 Vaduvoor Bird Sanctuary, 1991
 Udayamarthandapuram Bird Sanctuary, 1991
 Koonthankulam Bird Sanctuary, 1994
 Vellode Birds Sanctuary, 1997
 Karaivetti Bird Sanctuary, 1999
 Kanyakumari Wildlife Sanctuary, 2002
 Sathyamangalam Wildlife Sanctuary, 2008
 Kodaikanal Wildlife Sanctuary, 2013
 Cauvery North Wildlife Sanctuary, 2014
 Oussudu Lake Bird Sanctuary, 2015
 Megamalai Wildlife Sanctuary, 2016
 Gangaikondam Spotted Dear Wildlife Sanctuary]],
 Melaselvanoor-Keelaselvanoor WLS
 Mundanthurai WLS
 Nellai Wildlife Sanctuary
 Theerthangal  WLS
 Sakkarakottai  WLS

Telangana

 Pocharam Wildlife Sanctuary, 1952
 Pakhal Wildlife Sanctuary, 1952
 Eturnagaram Wildlife Sanctuary, 1953
 Kawal Wildlife Sanctuary, 1965
 Kinnerasani Wildlife Sanctuary, 1977
 Manjira Wildlife Sanctuary, 1978
 Nagarjunsagar-Srisailam Tiger Reserve, 1978
 Shivaram Wildlife Sanctuary, 1978
 Pranahita Wildlife Sanctuary, 1980

Tripura

 Sepahijala Wildlife Sanctuary, 1987
 Gumti Wildlife Sanctuary, 1988
 Rowa Wildlife Sanctuary, 1988
 Trishna Wildlife Sanctuary, 1988

Uttar Pradesh

Chandra Prabha Wildlife Sanctuary, 1957
Kishanpur Wildlife Sanctuary, 1972
Katarniaghat Wildlife Sanctuary, 1975
Ranipur Sanctuary, 1977
National Chambal Sanctuary, 1979
Bakhira Sanctuary, 1980
Kaimoor Wildlife Sanctuary, 1982
Hastinapur Wildlife Sanctuary, 1986
Samaspur Bird Sanctuary, 1987
Sohagi Barwa Wildlife Sanctuary, 1987
Kachhua Sanctuary, 1989
Okhla Sanctuary, 1990
Saman Bird Sanctuary, 1990
Sandi Bird Sanctuary, 1990
Vijai Sagar Wildlife Sanctuary, 1990
Patna Bird Sanctuary, 1991
Suhelva Sanctuary, 1998
Lakh Bahosi Sanctuary
Mahavir Swami Wildlife Sanctuary
Nawabganj Bird Sanctuary
Parvati Arga Bird Sanctuary
Sur Sarovar Sanctuary
Surha Tal Bird Sanctuary
Turtle WLS

Uttarakhand

 Govind Pashu Vihar Wildlife Sanctuary, 1955
 Kedarnath Wildlife Sanctuary, 1972
 Askot Musk Deer Sanctuary, 1986
 Sonanadi Wildlife Sanctuary, 1987
 Binsar Wildlife Sanctuary, 1988
 Mussoorie Wildlife Sanctuary, 1993
 Nandhaur Wildlife Sanctuary, 2012

West Bengal

 Chapramari Wildlife Sanctuary, 1976
 Haliday Island Wildlife Sanctuary, 1976
 Lothian Island Wildlife Sanctuary, 1976
 Mahananda Wildlife Sanctuary, 1976
 Sajnakhali Wildlife Sanctuary, 1976
 Senchal Wildlife Sanctuary, 1976
 Ballabhpur Wildlife Sanctuary, 1977
 Bethuadahari Wildlife Sanctuary, 1980
 Bibhutibhushan Wildlife Sanctuary, 1980
 Ramnabagan Wildlife Sanctuary, 1981
 Chintamoni Kar Bird Sanctuary, 1982
 Jore Pokhri Wildlife Sanctuary, 1986
 Raiganj Wildlife Sanctuary, 1985
 Buxa Tiger Reserve, 1986
 Mayurjharna Elephant Reserve, 2002

See also 
 List of national parks of India
 List of botanical gardens in India

 Tiger reserves of India

References

External links

Van Vihar National Park, Bhopal, MP